"I've Got My Captain Working for Me Now" is a popular song written in 1919 by Irving Berlin. It was published by Music Publishers Inc. in New York, New York.

The song tells of a young man who returns to work as a manager in his father's factory following his tour of duty as a Private First Class in World War I. His now-unemployed former Captain is hired as a clerk by the delighted former PFC. Sample lyric:

When I come into the office he gets up on his feet
Stands at attention and gives me his seat
Who was it said "revenge is sweet"?
I've got my Captain working for me now

This song was in the top 20 from October 1919 to January 1920 and reached number 6 in November and December 1919.

Al Jolson and Billy Murray had successful recordings of the song in 1919-20.  It was also recorded in 1919, by Eddie Cantor, for Pathe (#22201). The song was revived by Bing Crosby in the 1946 film, Blue Skies and he made a commercial recording for Decca Records on July 24, 1946 which was included in his album Blue Skies.

References

Further reading
Berlin, Irving, Robert Kimball, and Linda Emmet. The Complete Lyrics of Irving Berlin. New York: Knopf, 2000.  
Hoffmann, Frank W., Dick Carty, and Quentin Riggs. Billy Murray: The Phonograph Industry's First Great Recording Artist. Lanham, Md: Scarecrow Press, 1997.     
Vogel, Frederick G. World War I Songs: A History and Dictionary of American Popular Tunes, with Over 300 Complete Lyrics. Jefferson, NC: McFarland & Co., 1995.   
Wilder, Alec, and James T. Maher. American Popular Song: The Great Innovators, 1900–1950. New York: Oxford University Press, 1972.

External links
Complete lyrics
Recording by Billy Murray

1919 songs
Billy Murray (singer) songs
Songs written by Irving Berlin
Songs of World War I
Songs about military officers
Songs about soldiers
Songs about occupations
Songs about labor
Songs about revenge
Al Jolson songs
Eddie Cantor songs